Algámitas is a municipality in the province of Seville, Andalusia, southern Spain.  It is located some 110 kilometers from Seville.

References

Municipalities of the Province of Seville